From the Ground Up may refer to:
From the Ground Up (Shady Bard album)
From the Ground Up (Antigone Rising album)
From the Ground Up (Collective Soul EP)
From the Ground Up (The Roots EP)
From the Ground Up with Debbie Travis, a Canadian television series
"From the Ground Up" (song), a song by Dan + Shay
From the Ground Up, a song by Sleeping At Last
 From the Ground Up (film) 1921 American film directed by E. Mason Hopper